United Nations Security Council Resolution 97, adopted on January 30, 1952, dissolved the Commission for Conventional Armaments.

No details of the vote were given.

See also
List of United Nations Security Council Resolutions 1 to 100 (1946–1953)

References
Text of the Resolution at undocs.org

External links
 

 0097
Arms control
January 1952 events